Geir Aimar Rognø (born 31 March 1963 in Bergen, Norway) is a Norwegian musician (bass), known from the band "Hot Cargo" with the Bergen Guitarist Ole Thomsen.

Career
Roognø has played with musicians such as Jan Eggum, Dag Arnesen, Ole Thomsen, Mads Eriksen, Jan Teigen, Thor Endresen, Egil Eldøen, Rune Hauge and Kim Fairchild, and bands like Pål Thowsen Band, "Hot Cargo", "Gruv", "Funkaholics", "Little Big Band" and "Kjersti Misje Band" plus a number of international artists. He is known from numerous TV projects. Rognø started with Jazz fusion in the 1980s in the band Little Big Band. Inspired from The Crusaders and "Spyro Gyro", Dave Grusin and Herbie Hancock, this was a band in the forefront of Norwegian fusion music. He evolved a slap hand technique with inspirations from Stanley Clarke and Larry Graham. In the 80s, he worked as a freelance musician, with many jobs for theater.

Honors
Håndverkeren which is awarded annually to a musician who performs "music craft" in an exemplary manner, by Scandinavian Entertainment Service

Discography

With T.T. Jug, including with Tormod Kayser, Tord Søfteland and Jon Søfteland Sæbø
1982: Ungdommens Radioavis Rockemønstring (Philips), with various artists, "Dusty Freak"

with Ole Thomsen
1992: Hot Cargo (NorCD)

with Jan Eggum
2001: Ekte Eggum (Grappa)
2005: 30/30 (Grappa)

References

External links 
Hot Cargo live in Bergen 1992 playing "Til Jaco" on YouTube

Norwegian bass guitarists
Norwegian male bass guitarists
Musicians from Bergen
1963 births
Living people